Travis LaBoy (born August 20, 1981) is a former American football linebacker. He was drafted by the Tennessee Titans in the second round of the 2004 NFL Draft. He played college football at Hawaii. LaBoy is the son of former U. Hawaii DE Cliff LaBoy (1973–75). He is married to wife Laura Marie Laboy.

LaBoy also played for the Arizona Cardinals, San Francisco 49ers, and San Diego Chargers.

Early years
Travis Laboy attended Marin Catholic High School in Kentfield, California and lettered twice in football and basketball and three times in track.  He was named an All-State, All-League and All-Conference choice as a senior, leading team to state title as a senior and league titles as a junior and sophomore.  He was also the champion paddler in Northern California when he was a freshman.

College career
LaBoy transferred to the University of Hawaiʻi at Mānoa after spending his freshman year as a redshirt at Utah State University.

As a sophomore, earned Second-team All-WAC honors, playing in nine games, starting six contests at right defensive end.

As a senior, LaBoy earned First-team All-WAC honors and was named the conference's Defensive Player of the Year. He was the recipient of the team’s Alex Waterhouse Most Valuable Player Award. LaBoy Started 23 games at left defensive end, posting 76 tackles, five interceptions, and a conference-high 13 sacks.

Professional career

Pre-draft
At the NFL Combine, he was timed in 4.7 seconds in the 40-yard dash, performed 35 repetitions of 225-pounds and a 35½" vertical jump.

Tennessee Titans
He was selected with the 42nd overall pick in the 2004 NFL Draft by the Tennessee Titans. As a rookie, in 13 games with two starts, he totaled 34 tackles, 3.5 sacks, nine QB pressures, one tackle for a loss and one fumble recovery. A concussion forced him to miss all of preseason and to be deactivated for the first three games of the regular season. In 2005, he appeared in 15 games with seven starts for the Titans and posted 27 tackles with 14 assists and 6.5 sacks. In 2006, LaBoy played in 13 games with a career-high 11 starts at right defensive end. In 2007, he appeared in 13 games for the Titans and tied for third on the team with six sacks.

Arizona Cardinals
On March 3, 2008, the Arizona Cardinals signed LaBoy to a five-year $22 million contract with $7.5 million guaranteed. LaBoy got off to a hot start with four sacks in the first four games in 2008 but a biceps injury slowed him the rest of the season. Cardinals coach Ken Whisenhunt confirmed that LaBoy would need surgery to repair his torn biceps. LaBoy was released on April 28, 2009.

San Francisco 49ers
After missing the entire 2009 season after recovering from reconstructive foot surgery and biceps surgery, LaBoy signed with the San Francisco 49ers on April 20, 2010.
On December 18, LaBoy was placed on the injured reserve with a knee problem, ending his season. LaBoy finished his 2010 season with five sacks and 28 tackles.

San Diego Chargers
On July 29, 2011, the San Diego Chargers signed LaBoy to a 2-year contract. He was released by the Chargers on May 7, 2012. LaBoy retired after his release from the San Diego Chargers.

References

External links
Travis LaBoy Foundation
Arizona Cardinals bio
Tennessee Titans bio

1981 births
Living people
Players of American football from Hawaii
American football defensive ends
American football linebackers
Utah State Aggies football players
Hawaii Rainbow Warriors football players
Tennessee Titans players
Arizona Cardinals players
San Francisco 49ers players
San Diego Chargers players